Gilyto Semedo, aka Mr. Entertainer is a Cape Verdean Singer, Songwriter, Dancer, TV & Music Producer, Cultural Activist, Mentor Of Cabo Verde Music Awards-CVMA and PALOP Music Awards - PALOPMA.

Biography 
Gilyto was born in Assomada, Santa Catarina. 
In 1987 he moved to Portugal, in Lisbon he made his studies and later resided in Rotterdam The Netherlands too.  He recorded his first album Kel Tempu ("Aquele Tempo" in Portuguese, "That Time" in English) in 1999, his second was recorded in 2001 and was titled Nha Atriz Principal (My Main Actress) which he received his first Disco de Ouro - Gold Record award. He made various shows in Africa, Europe and Americas.  
The album Diamante Africana (African Diamond) was released in April 2005, became a huge successful. 
His first DVD "Mr. Entertainer" was released in the same year too (December 2015).

Traduson pa Tradison, a double album was released in December 2006(Acoustic).  
Two years later he released his Live DVD Live@Luxembourg (2008).  
A modern dance album Stribilin! came out on July 5, 2009.

He paused his music career in 2010 and in 2011 he started producing the first ever Cabo Verde Music Awards (CVMA) - March 12, through is Label GMS Entertainment.

Twelve years of his music career Best Of which were released on CD and DVD in December 2011.  
He also produced Novo Formato dos Festivais Pago in Cape Verde for the 21st Festival da Gamboa in Praia and Festival de Areia Grande-Pedra Badejo
15 Anos de Funaná/Kizomba on June 26, 2014, to commemorates fifteen years of his career, includes two new singles "Ranja Ku Mi" and "Segredu Sabi di Sabe".  
He was honored by the Municipality of Santa Catarina on November 25, the place of his birth.  
New Single "Peace and Love" was released on Valentine's Day, Feb. 14, 2015.

He was also honored by the Municipality of Santa Cruz(CV) and the mayor of Boston, Massachusetts(USA) Marty Walsh in May 2015 and Radio station "Nha Terra" (Roxbury) in recognition of his 15 years of his career and the contribution that he gave on the Cape Verdean culture.
Cultural's Projects with impact like "Talentu Strela" and "Cabo Verde Music Awards -CVMA".

The Single "Poder di Povu!" was released in Feb. 2016.

Also In 2016 the Mayor Bill Carpenter - City Of Brockton, Massachusetts(USA) honored Gilyto and his team CVMA for the 6th Edition of Cabo Verde Music Awards.

Gilyto is now working on the project "PALOP MUSIC AWARDS - PALOPMA 2017"...

Musical styles
His musical styles includes funana, kizomba, zouk, cabozouk, dance, cabo love and R & B.

Discography
1999 – Kel Tempu (That Time)
2001 – Nha Atriz Principal (My Main Actress)
2005 – Diamante Africana (African Diamond)
2006 – Traduson Pa Tradison (Acoustic)
2008 – Live@Luxembourg - Live album
2008 – Cabo Zouk in Brasil (Cabo Zouk in Brazil)
2009 - Stribilin!'
2011 - Best Of2014 -15 Anos de Funaná/Kizomba (15 Years of Funaná and Kizomba) - Double disc

DVDsMr. Entertainer, 2005Live@Luxembourg, 2008Stribilin!, 2009Best Of, 2011

Single
{| class="wikitable sortable"
|-
!Single!!Year!!Album
|-
|"Cynthia"||1999||Kel Tempu|-
|"Larga"||1999||Kel Tempu|-
|"Tenho medo"||2001||Lusodance 4|-
|"Sereia N'areia"||2001||"Nha Atriz Principal"
|-
|"Atriz Principal"||2001||Nha Atriz Principal"
|-
|"Diamante Afriana"||2005||Diamante Africana
|-
|"Bágu na Txáda"||2005||"Diamante Africana"
|-
|"Nôs Terra Morabeza"||2008||"Tradison Pa Tradison"
|-
|"Stribilin!"||2009||Stribilin!
|-
|"Champanhe & Chocolate"||2009||Stribilin!
|-
|"Sta na Môda"||2009||Stribilin!
|-
|"Ranja ku Mi"||2014||15 Anos de Funaná/Kizomba
|-
|"Segredu Sabi di Sabe"||2014||15 Anos de Funaná/Kizomba
|-
|"Peace and Love"||2015||
|-
|"Poder di Povu"||2016||
|}

Featurings
2001 – CD Lusodance IV
2003 – CD Explosão Love
2006 – CD/DVD Dança África 2
2007 – CD Kizomba Mix
2007 – CD/DVD Eddu (Prendem na Bô)
2007 - DVD/CD O Canto dos Animais (Animal Songs) (children's work)
2011 - CD Papagaio & As Moranguitas (children's work)
2011 - CD BCA
2012 - Papagaio & As Moranguitas (children's audiobook)
2014 - 2 CDs Papagaio & As Moranguitas (children's book)

Projects
O Canto Dos Animais”, 
Padrinho da Escola:  Girassol da Várzea (Praia, Cabo Verde)
Padrinho da FICASE
Padrinho da Escola: Achada Galedo
T-shirts MADE IN CABO VERDE - "INDEPENDENCE DAY"
O Papagaio & As Moranguitas
Talentu Strela
CABO VERDE MUSIC AWARDS(CVMA)
Primeiro Hino da Seleção Caboverdiana de Futebol(Tubarões Azuis)
Novo Formato dos Festivais Pago em Cabo Verde - GAMBÔA 2013 & SANTA CRUZ(Pedra Badejo).
PALOP MUSIC AWARDS - PALOPMA

External links

Gilyto/Mr. Entertainer on Facebook

1976 births
Living people
Zouk musicians
21st-century Cape Verdean male singers
People from Santa Catarina, Cape Verde